Stagecoach London is a major bus operator in Greater London. It is a subsidiary of Stagecoach and operates services under contract to Transport for London mostly in East and South East London as well as some services into Central London.

It is the largest subsidiary of the Stagecoach Group, with 283.4 million passengers journeys taken on Stagecoach London buses between May 2018 and April 2019, and as of March 2022, the fleet consisted of 1,191 buses.

History

In 1994 Stagecoach purchased the East London and Selkent operations during the privatisation of London bus services. Both continued to trade under their existing names until November 2000 when Stagecoach consolidated its London operations under the Stagecoach London brand with both remaining as separate legal entities.

In August 2006 Stagecoach sold its London bus operations to Macquarie Bank. The new owner restored the East London and Selkent trading name logos.

In September 2008 Thameside was established to operate route 248.

In October 2010 Stagecoach reacquired its old London operations with all operations once again rebranded as Stagecoach London.

In May 2022, Stagecoach announced it would takeover Tower Transit Lea Interchange garage for 20 million pounds. The takeover was completed on 25 June 2022. Stagecoach operates the garage under the Lea Interchange Bus Company Limited legal entity.

Operations
Stagecoach London operates services under contract to Transport for London. These are operated by 4 legal entities which all exist but under the Stagecoach London brand:

East London (East London Bus and Coach Company)
Selkent (South East London and Kent Bus Company)
Thameside (East London Bus Company)
Lea Interchange Bus Company (former Tower Transit operations at Lea Interchange)

In 2000 Stagecoach's standard bus livery of a dark blue skirt and orange and light blue swirl at the rear with the standard white replaced by red was introduced. After the sale to Macquarie Bank, an all red livery was introduced.

A coach operation traded under the brand East London Coaches ceasing in February 2007 and a Travelshop which closed in March 2009 that was based at the company's then Ilford head office. The head office is now at the West Ham depot.

See also
List of bus operators of the United Kingdom

References

External links
 
 London Buses website

London bus operators
Stagecoach Group bus operators in England
1994 establishments in England